Château d'Oche is a château in Saint-Priest-les-Fougères, Dordogne, Nouvelle-Aquitaine, France.

Châteaux in Dordogne